Chen Bijun (5 November 1891 – 17 June 1959) was a Chinese politician. She was the acting head of the Canton (Guangzhou) government for four months in 1944–1945.

Life
She was the daughter of the Chinese millionaire Chen Gengji and Wei Yuelang and was raised in Penang in British Malaya. In 1907, she became a member of the Tongmenghui. In 1909, she moved to Japan to study, and became a member of the Tongmenghui revolutionary group which attempted to assassinate Prince Chun in 1910. In 1912, she married Wang Jingwei.

She joined the Kuomintang (KMT) with him. In 1924, she was one of only three women delegates of the KMT national congress along with He Xiangning and Tang Yungong, and elected a member of the KMT Central Supervisory Committee. During the 1936 kidnapping of Chiang Kai-shek, the Xi'an Incident, she unsuccessfully attempted to have her spouse depose Chiang Kai-shek in a coup.

Wartime activities
During the Second Sino-Japanese War, she and her husband regarded the communists as a worse threat than the Japanese, and defected to the Japanese and established a puppet government under Japanese control.  Chen Bijun was elected member of the KMT Central Supervisory Committee for their government party. When her spouse died in 1944, he was replaced by Chen Gongbo. Chen Bijun left Nanjing and took control of the Canton government, which she kept for four months.

Post war
After the surrender of the Japanese in August 1945, she was offered but rejected an evacuation by the Japanese. She was arrested by the order of Chiang Kai-shek on 25 August and charged with treason. She refused to admit guilt. In 1949, she was imprisoned in Shanghai when the Communist took over the city. On the request of He Xiangning and Soong Ching-ling, Mao Zedong and Zhou Enlai offered her a pardon if she would admit guilty on the charge of treason, but as she refused, she remained in prison until her death.

In popular culture
The 2007 Chinese historical film Road to Dawn features the character "Xu Danrong" based on Chen played by Malaysian-born actress Angelica Lee.

References

1891 births
1959 deaths
Chinese collaborators with Imperial Japan
Kuomintang collaborators with Imperial Japan
Chinese people of World War II
Chinese revolutionaries
Expelled members of the Kuomintang
People of the Chinese Civil War
World War II political leaders
Chinese anti-communists
Chinese nationalists
Tongmenghui members
Chinese expatriates in France
Malaysian emigrants to China